FC Kehlen (in luxembourgish: FC Kielen) is a Luxembourgian football club located in Kehlen, Luxembourg. It currently plays in Luxembourg 1. Division. The team's colors are red and black .

External links
Official website

Kehlen
Kehlen
1946 establishments in Luxembourg